Christopher Raeburn (31 July 1928 in London – 18 February 2009 in Ivinghoe, Buckinghamshire) was an English record producer of international renown.

Life and career
Raeburn was educated at Charterhouse School and Oxford. Turning down a commission during his National Service, Raeburn was posted to Palestine as a clerk with the Royal Signals. While serving at Tel Litwinsky, he witnessed a terrorist attack on the base's cinema. Always interested in the theatre, he visited many plays, operas and concerts during his posting. On demobbing in 1948, Raeburn travelled across Egypt to Tripoli, returning to England by ship.

At Oxford Raeburn had taken part in drama work and had been employed at the Mermaid Theatre, including the production of Dido and Aeneas with Kirsten Flagstad and Arda Mandikian. He took a position with Decca Records in 1954. He took a leave of absence from Decca for a Leverhulme Scholarship to do research on Mozart in Vienna. He was a Vienna reviewer for Opera magazine (sometimes using a nom de plume) during his time in that city.

Raeburn worked for Decca Records for more than five decades specialising in producing albums of classical music, and in particular opera. He was on the production team for the first studio recording of Richard Wagner's Ring Cycle with conductor Georg Solti. His work also led to collaborations with several internationally renowned artists, including Luciano Pavarotti, Joan Sutherland, Renata Tebaldi, Mirella Freni, Birgit Nilsson, Marilyn Horne, Montserrat Caballé, Leontyne Price, Kiri Te Kanawa, Herbert von Karajan, Richard Bonynge, Plácido Domingo, José Carreras, Teresa Berganza and Angelika Kirchschlager. Many of his recordings have won Grammy Awards.

Raeburn worked with Vladimir Ashkenazy and András Schiff, and produced Hans Hotter's last lieder recitals. His last recording was made with Cecilia Bartoli, whom he signed with Decca in 1986, for her 2007 Decca tribute CD of music associated with Maria Malibran.

Raeburn stated that he always strove to achieve a 'theatrical' atmosphere in the opera recordings that he produced. Raeburn's recognitions included the Franz Schalk Gold Medal from the Vienna Philharmonic Orchestra, the Midem Lifetime Achievement, and Gramophone magazine's Special Achievement Award for his "unswerving honesty, integrity and expertise".

Raeburn took speaking parts (under the pseudonym Omar Godknow) in the audio recordings of Giuditta, Die Fledermaus and Il segreto di Susanna which he produced.

He was twice married and divorced; the godparents of his three daughters were Leontyne Price, Tom Krause and Marilyn Horne.

See also
 Mozart: Le nozze di Figaro (Herbert von Karajan recording)
 Mozart: Le nozze di Figaro (Georg Solti recording)

References

1928 births
2009 deaths
English record producers
Alumni of Worcester College, Oxford
People educated at Charterhouse School
20th-century British Army personnel
Royal Corps of Signals soldiers
20th-century British businesspeople